The 2016 Big Ten men's basketball tournament was the postseason men's basketball tournament for the Big Ten Conference held from March 9 through March 13 at Bankers Life Fieldhouse in Indianapolis, Indiana. It was the nineteenth annual Big Ten men's basketball tournament and was the second tournament to feature 14 teams of the expanded Big Ten, including Maryland and Rutgers. The championship was won by Michigan State who defeated Purdue in the championship game. As a result, Michigan State received the conference's automatic bid to the NCAA tournament. The win marked Michigan State's fifth tournament championship, the most tournament championships by any team in the Big Ten (Ohio State has won five championships as well, but one has been vacated). It was Michigan State's third straight appearance in the championship game and their fourth appearance in the championship in the prior five years. Denzel Valentine was named the Tournament's Most Outstanding Player.

Seeds
All 14 Big Ten schools participated in the tournament. Teams were seeded by conference record, with a tiebreaker system used to seed teams with identical conference records. Seeding for the tournament was determined at the close of the regular conference season. The top 10 teams received a first round bye and the top four teams received a double bye. Tiebreaking procedures were unchanged from the 2015 tournament.

Schedule

Game summaries

First round

Second round

Quarterfinals

Semifinals

Championship

Bracket

* denotes overtime period

All-Tournament Team
Denzel Valentine, Michigan State – Big Ten tournament Most Outstanding Player
Zak Irvin, Michigan
Shavon Shields, Nebraska
Vincent Edwards, Purdue
A. J. Hammons, Purdue

See also
 2016 Big Ten Conference women's basketball tournament

References

External links
Tournament results at BigTen.org

Big Ten men's basketball tournament
Tournament
Big Ten Conference men's basketball tournament
Big Ten men's basketball tournament